Da Vinci (formerly Da Vinci Learning) is a  brand used for a group of educational television channels, on-demand services, and mobile apps for families, owned by Macademia. Da Vinci services are available in 22 languages and in over 90 countries, across North America, Europe, Asia and Africa. It broadcasts STEM and soft skills-based learning programs aimed at children and families during the daytime, and documentaries and educational series for grown-ups in the evenings.



History
Da Vinci Learning was launched on 15 September 2007 by its parent company, Da Vinci Media GmbH, and is headquartered in Berlin, Germany, with subsidiary offices in Singapore, Istanbul, Warsaw and Johannesburg. The channel was rebranded in 2018, which included a name change to Da Vinci.

On 31 December 2019, UK-based Media and Edtech company Macademia (formerly Azoomee) acquired Da Vinci Media which includes its linear channel (Da Vinci), mobile app (Da Vinci Kids), and programming.

Programming
Da Vinci offers edutainment programming in 22 languages for Millennial and Gen Z families focused on 21st century skills, including STEM, creativity, Social–emotional learning and Critical thinking via TV channels, on-demand services (for example Comcast Xfinity) and via a dedicated kids app, Da Vinci Kids.

Programs currently airing on Da Vinci include:

 Absolute Genius with Dick and Dom (BAFTA Children's Presenters Award 2014)
 Art with Mati and Dada
 Chasing Longevity (New York Festivals 2015)
 Culture Quest with Mr. Otter
 Doki (TV Series)
 Did You Know?
 Finding Stuff Out (Canadian Screen Award 2016)
 Full Proof (Emmy Kids Award Nominee)
 Horrible Histories (International Emmy Kids Award 2016, UK Broadcast Award 2018)
 Look Kool (International Emmy Award Nominee)
 Make Me A Super (New York Festivals 2018 Finalist)
 mathXplosion (Telly Awards Bronze Winner, Youth Media Alliance 2017 Winner)
 Mily Miss Questions
 Mystery of Matter (Emmy Award Outstanding Lighting Direction & Scenic Design)
 Nature Tech (Emmy Award Cinematography – Nature Documentaries)
 Operation Ouch! (BAFTA Children's Factual 2013 and 2014, BAFTA Best Children's Factual Nominee 2015 & and 2016 BAFTA Best Presenter Award Nominees 2015-2018)
 Science Max (Canadian Screen Award – Best Children's Program 2017 & 2018)
 Siesta Z (2017 International Emmy Kids Award Nominee)
 Snapshots (2018 International Emmy Kids Award)
 Xploration Awesome Planet (2015 Daytime Emmy Awards Nominee)
 Xploration DIY SCI (Daytime Emmy Awards Nominee 2017 & 2018)

References

Television channels and stations established in 2007
Educational and instructional television channels
Documentary television channels